Gandab-e Olya (also Romanized as Gandāb-e ‘Olyā and Gandab Olya; also known as Gandāb-e Bālā and Kandāb Bāla) is a village in Chaharduli-ye Sharqi Rural District, Chaharduli District, Qorveh County, Kurdistan Province, Iran. At the 2006 census, its population was 918, in 243 families. The village is populated by Azerbaijanis.

References 

Towns and villages in Qorveh County
Azerbaijani settlements in Kurdistan Province